William Robert Miller (29 December 1881 – 29 December 1912) was an Australian rules footballer who played for Norwood in the South Australian National Football League (SANFL).

He died from typhoid on his 31st birthday, at a hospital in Rose Park.

External links

References

1881 births
1912 deaths
Australian rules footballers from South Australia
Norwood Football Club players
Sturt Football Club players
People from Kapunda
Deaths from typhoid fever